The Iron Maidens are an American heavy metal band from Los Angeles, formed in 2001 as an all-female tribute act to English heavy metal band Iron Maiden. The band currently consists of drummer Linda McDonald, bassist Wanda Ortiz, lead vocalist Kirsten Rosenberg and guitarists Courtney Cox and Nikki Stringfield.

History 
The Iron Maidens were originally formed in June 2001 by lead vocalist Jenny Warren and bassist Melanie Sisneros, formerly of the Iron Maiden tribute band Wrathchild. drummer Linda McDonald and guitarist Josephine Draven, both formerly of Phantom Blue, and guitarist Sara Marsh, joined Warren and Sisneros shortly afterward to form the band's first lineup. Sisneros left the band in 2002 to pursue other interests and was replaced by Wanda Ortiz.

In 2003, the band started work on their debut album. The project was delayed when Warren gave notice of her departure from the band to focus more on her personal and child's needs. After Warren's departure, new vocalist Aja Kim made her debut in the band and helped complete the album (World's Only Female Tribute to Iron Maiden), which was released in June 2005.

After the album's release, Draven left the band. In February 2007, Heather Baker joined to replace Draven. In May, the band released its second album Route 666, which features a guest appearance by Motörhead guitarist Phil Campbell.

In summer 2008, Heather Baker and Aja Kim left the band to pursue solo careers. The two were replaced by guitarist Courtney Cox and vocalist Kirsten Rosenberg (formerly of the Maryland-based cover band HighWire). In January 2010, Marsh, who was ill, was taken off some of the Japanese tour shows and did not rejoin the band. Baker rejoined the band to temporarily fill in Marsh's spot for a handful of shows.

In August 2010, The Iron Maidens released a DVD of their Japan tour titled Metal Gathering Tour Live in Japan 2010.

Upon Marsh's departure from the band, former members Elizabeth Schall and Heather Baker would return briefly to fill in the vacant Murray position (2009–2010). For tours 2010–2014, the role of Dave Murray would be shared between artists Nili Brosh, Nita Strauss, and Nikki Stringfield. In 2014,the band approached Nikki Stringfield to become a permanent member in the Murray position.

Nita Strauss (Ibanez), Courtney Cox (Caparison) and Nikki Stringfield (Schecter) are the first female artists to have their own signature guitar with their associated guitar companies.

In June 2014, Nita Strauss was hired to replace Orianthi as Alice Cooper's touring guitarist for the remaining 2014 tour dates. She has toured with Alice Cooper since that time.

On September 8, 2015, the group announced that long-time guest guitarist Nikki Stringfield had been officially added as a permanent member of the band.

Rosenberg and Stringfield appeared as contestants on the August 3, 2017, episode of the music game show Beat Shazam.

Members 

Current members
 Linda McDonald ("Nikki McBurrain") – drums, backing vocals (2001-present)
 Wanda Ortiz ("Steph Harris") – bass, backing vocals (2002-present)
 Kirsten Rosenberg ("Bruce Chickinson") – lead vocals (2008-present)
 Courtney Cox ("Adriana Smith") – guitars, backing vocals (2008-present)
 Nikki Stringfield ("Davina Murray") – guitars, backing vocals (2012-present)

Former members / fill-in members
 Melanie Sisneros ("Steve Heiress") – bass (2001–2002)
 Jenny Warren ("Bruce Chickinson") – lead vocals (2001–2003)
 Jojo Draven ("Adrienne Smith") – guitars (2001–2005)
 Sara Marsh ("Mini Murray") – guitars (2001–2010)
 Aja Kim ("Bruce Lee Chickinson") – lead vocals (2003–2008)
 Elizabeth Schall ("Adrianne Smith" and "Deena Murray") – guitars (2005–2006)
 Heather Baker ("Dee Murray" and "Adrienne Smith") – guitars (2007–2008, 2010)
 Nili Brosh ("Mega Murray") – guitars (2010–2013)
 Nita Strauss ("Mega Murray") – guitars (2011–2015)

Timeline

Discography

Albums 
World's Only Female Tribute to Iron Maiden (2005)
Route 666 (2007)
The Root of All Evil (2008)

Videos 
Metal Gathering Tour Live in Japan 2010 (2010)

References

External links 

 
 

Heavy metal musical groups from California
Iron Maiden (band)
All-female tribute bands
Musical groups from Los Angeles
Musical groups established in 2001
Musical quintets
2001 establishments in California
Women in metal